The 2000 Texas A&M Aggies football team completed the season with a 7–5 record.  The Aggies had a regular season Big 12 record of 5–3.

Schedule

Game summaries

Notre Dame

Wyoming

UTEP

Texas Tech

Colorado

Baylor

Iowa State

Kansas State

Oklahoma State

Oklahoma

Texas

Mississippi State

Rankings

References

Texas AandM
Texas A&M Aggies football seasons
Texas AandM Aggies football